Bozov may refer to:

Božov Potok, a village in Serbia
Yordan Bozov (born 1979), Bulgarian basketball player

See also
Bozova